The 7th Annual Premios Oye! took place at the Foro Monumental in Zacatecas, Zacatecas on November 26, 2008. The nominees were announced on September 29 with Vicente Fernández receiving 5 nominations, followed by Julieta Venegas and Juanes with 4 each one, with 3 each one, Amandititita and Ximena Sariñana. Miguel Bosé will be awarded by the Academia Nacional de la Música en México for his 31 years or career. The voting process is certified by PricewaterhouseCoopers.

Performers
 Nigga — Te Quiero / Escápate
 Playa Limbo — El Tiempo De Tí
 Belanova — One, Two, Three, Go! (1, 2, 3, Go!)
 Vicente Fernández — La Penca Del Maguey / Para Siempre / Estos Celos / Acá Entre Nos / Mujeres Divinas
 Margarita "La Diosa De La Cumbia" — Si Tienes Otro Amor
 Ha*Ash — No Te Quiero Nada
 Miguel Bosé — Morenamía
 Yuridia — En Su Lugar
 Pablo Montero with los niños de la casa hogar de Zacatecas — Piquito De Oro
 La Arrolladora Banda El Limón — Y Que Quede Claro

Nominees and Winners

General Field

Album of the Year
  Fuerza — Alejandra Guzmán
Loris Ceroni, producer.
  Fantasía Pop — Belanova
Cachorro López & Belanova, producers.
  La Vida Es Un Ratico — Juanes
Gustavo Santaolalla & Juanes, producers.
  Julieta Venegas MTV Unplugged — Julieta Venegas
Julieta Venegas & Jaques Morelenbaum, producers.
  Papitour — Miguel Bosé
Pete Walsh & Miguel Bosé, producers.

Record of the Year
  "Metrosexual" — Amanda Escalante, songwriter (Amandititita)
  "Cinco Minutos" - Erika Ender & Amerika, songwriters (Gloria Trevi)
  "Me Enamora" — Juan Esteban Aristazábal, songwriter (Juanes)
  "El Presente" - Julieta Venegas, songwriter (Julieta Venegas)
  "Te Quiero" — Félix Gómez, songwriter (Nigga)

Best New Artist
  Amandititita — Amandititita
  Cualquier Día — Kany García
  Te Quiero — Nigga
  Canciones De Hotel — Playa Limbo
  Mediocre — Ximena Sariñana

Pop Field

Best Male Pop
  Retro — Emmanuel
  La Vida Es Un Ratico — Juanes
  Cómplices — Luis Miguel
  Papitour — Miguel Bosé
  Te Quiero — Nigga

Best Female Pop
  Fuerza — Alejandra Guzmán
  Amandititita — Amandititita
  Una Rosa Blu — Gloria Trevi
  Cualquier Día — Kany García
  Entre Mariposas — Yuridia

Best Pop by a Duo/Group
  Fantasía Pop — Belanova
  Nadha — Kudai
  Canciones De Hotel — Playa Limbo
  Empezar Desde Cero — RBD
  Hasta Ahora — Sin Bandera

Rock Field

Best Rock by a Duo/Group or Solo
  Sino — Café Tacuba
  Julieta Venegas MTV Unplugged — Julieta Venegas
  Arde El Cielo — Maná
  17 — Motel
  Mediocre — Ximena Sariñana

English Field

Album of the Year
  As I Am — Alicia Keys
Alicia Keys & Kerry Brothers, Jr., producers.
  Psychédélices — Alizée
Alizée, producer.
  Back To Black — Amy Winehouse
Mark Ronson & Salaam Remi, producers.
  Viva La Vida — Coldplay
Markus Dravs, Brian Eno, Jon Hopkins & Rik Simpson, producers.
  Hard Candy — Madonna
Madonna, producer.

Record of the Year
  "No One" — Alicia Keys, Kerry Brothers, Jr. & George D. Harry, songwriters (Alicia Keys)
  "You Know I'm No Good" - Amy Winehouse, songwriter (Amy Winehouse)
  "Viva La Vida" - Guy Berryman, Jonny Buckland, Will Champion & Chris Martin, songwriters (Coldplay)
  "S.O.S." - Nick Jonas, songwriter (Jonas Brothers)
  "4 Minutes" - Madonna, Timbaland, Justin Timberlake & Nathaniel Hills, songwriters (Madonna featuring Justin Timberlake)

Best New Artist
  Rockferry — Duffy
  Jonas Brothers — Jonas Brothers
  Dreaming Out Loud — OneRepublic
  Riot! — Paramore
  One Chance — Paul Potts

Popular Field

Album of the Year
  Que Bonito Es Lo Bonito — Banda el Recodo
Fonovisa Records & María de Jesús Lizárraga, producers.
  2C — Intocable
Chuy Flores, producer.
  Y Que Quede Claro — La Arrolladora Banda El Limón
Disa Records, producer.
  100% Mexicano — Pepe Aguilar
Pepe Aguilar & Chuy Flores, producers.
  Para Siempre — Vicente Fernández
Joan Sebastian, producer.

Record of the Year
  "Tu Adiós No Mata" — Oswaldo Villareal, songwriter (Intocable)
  "Sobre Mis Pies" - Isidro Chávez, songwriter (La Arrolladora Banda El Limón)
  "Amiga Por Favor" — Gilberto Gless, songwriter (Pedro Fernández)
  "Para Siempre" — Joan Sebastian, songwriter (Vicente Fernández)
  "Estos Celos" — Joan Sebastian, songwriter (Vicente Fernández)

Best New Artist
  Tiraré A Matar — Banda La Bufadora
  Pensando En Tí — Germán Montero
  Josel Y Raúl — Josel Y Raúl
  Llegando A Tí — Los Herederos De Nuevo León
  El Regreso De Los Reyes — Cruz Martínez presenta Los Super Reyes

Best Norteño by a Duo/Group or Solo
  Que Ganas De Volver — Conjunto Primavera
  2C — Intocable
  Raíces — Los Tigres del Norte
  Mi Tesoro Norteño — Pablo Montero
  Corridos: Defendiendo El Honor — Pesado

Best Grupero by a Duo/Group or Solo
  Más Broncos Que Nunca — El Gigante De América
  Buena Suerte — La Firma
  Así Somos — LMT
  Recuerdos del Alma — Los Temerarios
  Una Noche en Madrid — Marco Antonio Solís

Best Ranchero by a Duo/Group or Solo
  A Puro Dolor — Nadia
  Las Mujeres Mandan — Paquita la del Barrio
  Dime Mi Amor — Pedro Fernández
  100% Mexicano — Pepe Aguilar
  Para Siempre — Vicente Fernández

Best Banda/Duranguense by a Duo/Group or Solo
  El Avion De Las Tres — AK-7
  Que Bonito Es Lo Bonito — Banda el Recodo
  No Es De Madera — Joan Sebastian
  Y Que Quede Claro — La Arrolladora Banda El Limón
  Ayer, Hoy Y Siempre — Los Horóscopos de Durango

Best Tropical by a Duo/Group or Solo
  Planeta Kumbia — A.B. Quintanilla presenta Kumbia All Starz
  Caribe Gardel — Jerry Rivera
  El Regreso De Los Reyes — Cruz Martínez presenta Los Super Reyes
   Tentaciones — Margarita "La Diosa de la Cumbia"
  Exitos en 2 Tiempos — Olga Tañón

Video of the Year Field

Video in Spanish
  Cada Que... — Belanova
Ángel Flores, video director; Ángel Flores, video producer
  Ésta Vez — Café Tacuba
Nosotros, video director; Nosotros, video producer
  Me Enamora — Juanes
Aggressive, video director; JP Fox, video producer
  El Presente — Julieta Venegas
Milton Lage, video director; Milton Lage, video producer
  Vida Paralelas — Ximena Sariñana
Pablo Dávila, video director

Theme from a Telenovela, Movie or Television Series

Theme of the year in Spanish
  "No Se Me Hace Fácil" — Gian Marco, songwriter (Alejandro Fernández)
Juan Osorio, producer (Tormenta en el paraíso)
  "Alma De Hierro" — Juan Fernando Fonseca, songwriters (Fonseca)
Roberto Gómez Fernández, producer (Alma De Hierro)
  "Esto Es Lo Que Soy" — Jesse Huerta & Joy Huerta, songwriters (Jesse & Joy)
Rosy Ocampo, producer (Las Tontas No Van al Cielo)
  "Hay Amores" - Shakira Mebarak, songwriter (Shakira)
Scott Steindorff, producers (Love in the Time of Cholera)
  "Para Siempre" — Joan Sebastian, songwriter (Vicente Fernández)
Salvador Mejía, producer (Fuego en la sangre)

Best Song with a Message
  Lejos De Aquí — Kudai

Tribute to the artistic
  Miguel Bosé

Audience Award
  Pepe Aguilar

References

External links
Premios Oye!
Winners — Reforma

Premios Oye!
Premios Oye!
Mexican music awards